The three-spine bass (Caraibops trispinosus) is a species of ray-finned fish, a lanternbelly from the family Acropomatidae. It is a deep water species which is found in the western Atlantic from the northeastern Gulf of Mexico to Surinam. This fish was first formally described in 1984 as Synagrops trispinosus but in 2017 was placed in the monotypic genus Caraibops.

References

Acropomatidae
Fish described in 1984